Alkino (Älkä) is a rural locality (a selo) and the administrative centre of Alkinsky Selsoviet, Salavatsky District, Bashkortostan, Russia. The population was 488 as of 2010. There are 13 streets.

Geography 
Alkino is located 14 km southwest of Maloyaz (the district's administrative centre) by road. Idrisovo is the nearest rural locality.

References 

Rural localities in Salavatsky District